The Research Domain Criteria (RDoC) project is an initiative of personalized medicine in psychiatry developed by US National Institute of Mental Health (NIMH). In contrast to the Diagnostic and Statistical Manual of Mental Disorders (DSM) maintained by the American Psychiatric Association (APA), RDoC aims to address the heterogeneity in the current nosology by providing a biologically-based, rather than symptom-based, framework for understanding mental disorders. "RDoC is an attempt to create a new kind of taxonomy for mental disorders by bringing the power of modern research approaches in genetics, neuroscience, and behavioral science to the problem of mental illness."

Call for creation

The 2008 NIMH Strategic Plan calls for NIMH to "Develop, for research purposes, new ways of classifying mental disorders based on dimensions of observable behavior and neurobiological measures." The strategic plan continues:

Currently, the diagnosis of mental disorders is based on clinical observation—identifying symptoms that tend to cluster together, determining when the symptoms appear, and determining whether the symptoms resolve, recur, or become chronic. However, the way that mental disorders are defined in the present diagnostic system does not incorporate current information from integrative neuroscience research, and thus is not optimal for making scientific gains through neuroscience approaches. It is difficult to deconstruct clusters of complex behaviors and attempt to link these to underlying neurobiological systems. Many mental disorders may be considered as falling along multiple dimensions (e.g., cognition, mood, social interactions), with traits that exist on a continuum ranging from normal to extreme. Co-occurrence of multiple mental disorders might reflect different patterns of symptoms that result from shared risk factors and perhaps the same underlying disease processes.

To clarify the underlying causes of mental disorders, it will be necessary to define, measure, and link basic biological and behavioral components of normal and abnormal functioning. This effort will require integration of genetic, neuroscience, imaging, behavioral, and clinical studies. By linking basic biological and behavioral components, it will become possible to construct valid, reliable phenotypes (measurable traits or characteristics) for mental disorders. This will help us elucidate the causes of the disorder, while clarifying the boundaries and overlap between mental disorders. In order to understand mental disorders in terms of dimensions and/or components of neurobiology and behaviors, it will be important to:

 Initiate a process for bringing together experts in clinical and basic sciences to jointly identify the fundamental behavioral components that may span multiple disorders (e.g., executive functioning, affect regulation, person perception) and that are more amenable to neuroscience approaches.
 Develop reliable and valid measures of these fundamental components of mental disorders for use in basic studies and in more clinical settings.
 Determine the full range of variation, from normal to abnormal, among the fundamental components to improve understanding of what is typical versus pathological.
 Integrate the fundamental genetic, neurobiological, behavioral, environmental, and experiential components that comprise these mental disorders.

Contrast with DSM
On April 29, 2013, a few weeks before the publication of the DSM-5, NIMH director Thomas Insel published a blog post critical of the DSM methodology and highlighting the improvement offered by the RDoC project.

Wrote Insel:
While DSM has been described as a 'Bible' for the field, it is, at best, a dictionary, creating a set of labels and defining each. The strength of each of the editions of DSM has been "reliability" – each edition has ensured that clinicians use the same terms in the same ways. The weakness is its lack of validity. Unlike our definitions of ischemic heart disease, lymphoma, or AIDS, the DSM diagnoses are based on a consensus about clusters of clinical symptoms, not any objective laboratory measure.

In that post, Insel wrote: "Patients with mental disorders deserve better." He would later elaborate on this point, saying "I look at the data and I'm concerned. ... I don't see a reduction in the rate of suicide or prevalence of mental illness or any measure of morbidity. I see it in other areas of medicine and I don't see it for mental illness. That was the basis for my comment that people with mental illness deserve better."

In their effort to resolve their issues with the new DSM, the NIMH launched the Research Domain Criteria Project (RDoC), based on four assumptions:
 A diagnostic approach based on the biology as well as the symptoms must not be constrained by the current DSM categories,
 Mental disorders are biological disorders involving brain circuits that implicate specific domains of cognition, emotion, or behavior,
 Each level of analysis needs to be understood across a dimension of function,
 Mapping the cognitive, circuit, and genetic aspects of mental disorders will yield new and better targets for treatment.
Insel stressed that the RDoC is not designed as diagnostic criteria to replace the DSM, but rather as a research framework, for future development. His argument centers around the claim that, "symptom-based diagnosis, once common in other areas of medicine, has been largely replaced in the past half century as we have understood that symptoms alone rarely indicate the best choice of treatment." As a result of this position, the NIMH is no longer using the DSM as the criteria upon which they will evaluate funding of future clinic trials.

DSM researcher Eric Hollander was quoted as saying "I do think it does represent a lack of interest and faith on behalf of NIMH for the DSM process and an investment in alternative diagnostic systems."

A NIMH description of RDoC explained:
Currently, diagnosis in mental disorders is based on clinical observation and patients' phenomenological symptom reports ... However, in antedating contemporary neuroscience research, the current diagnostic system is not informed by recent breakthroughs in genetics; and molecular, cellular and systems neuroscience.

RDoC matrix
The RDoC matrix is one way of organizing the concepts involved, with domains as tables, constructs as rows, sub-constructs as subrows and units of analysis often presented as columns.

The domains are tentative: "It is important to emphasize that these particular domains and constructs are simply starting points that are not definitive or set in concrete." Also, subconstructs have been added to some constructs. For example, Visual Perception, Auditory Perception, and Olfactory/Somatosensory/Multimodal perception as subconstructs of the Perception construct.

Methodology
The RDoC methodology distinguishes itself from traditional systems of diagnostic criteria.

Unlike conventional diagnostic systems (e.g. DSM) which use categorization, RDoC is a "dimensional system" — it relies on dimensions that "span the range from normal to abnormal."

Whereas conventional diagnostic systems incrementally revise and build upon their pre-existing paradigms, "RDoC is agnostic about current disorder categories." Official documents explain this feature, writing: "Rather than starting with an illness definition and seeking its neurobiological underpinnings, RDoC begins with current understandings of behavior-brain relationships and links them to clinical phenomena."

Unlike conventional diagnostic systems, which typically rely on self-report and behavioral measures alone, the RDoC framework has the "explicit goal" of allowing investigators access to a wider range of data. In addition to self-report measures or measure of behavior, RDoC also incorporates units of analysis beyond those found in the DSM — allowing RDoC to be informed by insights into genes, molecules, cells, circuits, physiology, and large-scale paradigms. Early data driven approaches to RDoC based continuous transdiagnostic psychiatric phenotypes predictict clinical prognosis across diagnosis and have genetic correlates that in not only clinical populations.

References

Further reading

External links
 NIMH page on RDoC
 "Toward a new understanding of mental illness" a TED talk given by Director of the National Institute of Mental Health Thomas R. Insel
 Video introduction to RDoC by NIMH

Classification of mental disorders
National Institutes of Health